San Pedro Cajonos is a town and municipality in Oaxaca in south-western Mexico. The municipality covers an area of  km². 
It is part of the Villa Alta District in the center of the Sierra Norte Region. It was founded on September 16, 1700 and given the name of San Pedro Cajonos. The language spoken in the town is a mix of Spanish and a lesser amount of spoken indigenous language called Cajonos Zapotec.,

References

Municipalities of Oaxaca